State Route 305 (SR 305) is a south-north state highway located in the east central part of the U.S. state of Georgia. It runs entirely within Burke County, with a short section near its northern terminus along the Burke-Jefferson county line.

Route description
SR 305 begins at an intersection with SR 56 in Midville. The route heads north along Jones Street until it leaves Midville. It continues northward, passing through rural parts of western Burke County and the unincorporated communities of Magruder and Rosier, until it meets SR 24 in Vidette.  SR 305 continues northward through the unincorporated communities of Gough and St. Clair, where it intersects SR 80. It heads northwest until the roadway runs along the Burke-Jefferson County line. Just after this, it meets its northern terminus, an intersection with SR 88 just south of Keysville.

History

Major intersections

See also

References

External links

305
Transportation in Burke County, Georgia